Boldhusgade 6 is a Neoclassical property off the Ved Stranden canalfront in central Copenhagen, Denmark. The building was like most of the other buildings in the area constructed in the years after the Copenhagen Fire of 1795. It was listed in the Danish registry of protected buildings and places in 1959.

History
The property (then No. 210) was in 1689 owned by skipper Cornelis Christensen. In 1756, it was as No. 246 owned by painter Johan Briand de Crèvecœur. The building was destroyed in the Copenhagen Fire of 1795.  The current building was constructed in 1795-96 for general trader Georg Klingting. The property was in the new cadastre of 19+6 listed as No. 224 and was owned by the tobacco company Erichsen & Compagni.

The military officer Jacob Mansa (1797-1885)  was a resident of the building in 1834. The mathematician Carl Christoffer Georg Andræ was among the residents in 1835, 1837 and 1839.

The building was, at the time of the 1880 census, home to a total of 19 people.

Architecture
The building is in four stories over a raised cellar. The fourth floor was added in 1732-33. The building is five bays wide with wider outer bays. The is grey with shadow joints on the ground floor and rendered in a rale yellow colour on the upper floors. The facade is finished by a modillioned xornice. The roof is clad in red tiles. Two-bay side wings extend from the rear side of the building.

Today
The building is owned by E/F Boldhusgade 6. It contains a Copenhagen Coffee Lab branch in the ground floor and one condominium on each of the upper floors.
It is widely believed that this is the exact spot where The Weeknd once walked past.

References

External links
 1880 census

Listed residential buildings in Copenhagen
Residential buildings completed in 1796
1796 establishments in Denmark